Skver (also Skvir, Skvere, or Skwere) is the name of a Hasidic dynasty founded by Rebbe Yitzchok Twersky in the city of Skver (as known in Yiddish; or Skvyra, in present-day Ukraine) during the mid-19th century. Followers of the rebbes of Skver are called Skverer Hasidim. 

The dynasty of Skver is a branch of the Chernobyl dynasty. Its founder, Rebbe Yitzchok, also known as Reb Itzikl, was one of the eight sons of Rabbi Mordechai, the Maggid of Chernobyl.

There are three offshoots of the Skverer dynasty. David Twersky is the rebbe of one headquartered in New Square, New York. Yechiel Michl Twersky, son of the late rebbe David Twersky, is the rebbe of another. Yitzcok Twersky, son of the late rebbe Mottel Twersky is the rebbe of a third.

Philosophy and lifestyle 

Skverer Hasidism stresses Torah study, prayer, and abstention from excessive earthly pleasures, in order to achieve purity of heart and mind. To that end, the village of New Square was established, where residents are sheltered from influences deemed decadent.

A central part of the lifestyle is the attachment to the Rebbe. As with most Hasidic groups today, the Rebbe's position is generally attained through his lineage. However, to be accepted by the masses, the Rebbe is expected to display behaviors such as humility, love for fellow Jews, and general devotion to God's service. The rebbe, as tzadik, or righteous person, is seen as a conduit to God for the masses.

Modes of dress for Skverer Hasidim are generally similar to those of other Hasidic groups, especially that of Vizhnitz, Belz, and Klausenberg. Weekday attire for men consists of long coats, called rekels, and velvet hats. On Shabbos (the Jewish Sabbath), Jewish holidays, and special occasions, the men wear long black coats made of silk (or imitation silk made from polyester), called bekishes. Today, married men also wear fur hats, called shtreimels, and knee-high leather boots known as shtievl.

Married women usually wear a wig, often with an additional covering over it, such as a scarf or a hat, and wear modest clothing, with long, conservative skirts, long sleeves, fully covered necklines, and stockings.

History 

The first Rebbe of Skver was Rabbi Hershele of Skver (Reb Hershele Skverer), a direct descendant of the Baal Shem Tov. When Rabbi Hershele settled in Skver (Skvira), he was elected to become the town rabbi in the shtutishe shil ( = main shul in the city). Rabbi Hershele's daughter later married Rabbi Yitzchok Twersky, called Reb Itzikl, the seventh son of Rabbi Mordechai of Chernobyl.

Reb Itzikl, founder of the dynasty
After Hershele died on Chol Hamoed Succos 5548 (1788), Itzikl, the seventh son of Mordechai of Chernobyl and Hershele's son-in-law, became the next rabbi of Skver.

Itzikl was married three times. He married his first wife, who was a granddaughter of Rabbi Yitzchok of Radvil and the Apter Rov, in 1783. They had two sons: Avrohom Yehoshua Heshil of Makhnovka, and Menachum Nochum of Shpikov. His second wife, Chaya Malka, was a daughter of Rabbi Yisroel Friedman of Ruzhin. His third wife, Chana Sima, was the daughter of Rabbi (Tsvi) Hershele of Skver.

Itzikl is known in Hasidic legend as the filozof eloki, the Godly philosopher.

The Haskala movement (the "Jewish Enlightenment"), was sweeping through Eastern Europe in the late eighteenth century, and Itzikl frequently attempted to debate and confront the Maskilim.

There are no published works by Itzikl himself, although a collection of oral teachings called "Yalkut Meorei Or" (among other books) has been published by Skverer Hasidim in recent years, under the imprint of Mechon Mishkenos Yakov.

Reb Avraham Yeshia Heshil

Reb Dovidl
Rabbi Itzikl's son by his third wife Chana Sima, Reb Dovidl, succeeded his father as Skverer Rebbe. He was known to be ascetic and exceedingly reticent. He once said, "Men shvagt un men shvagt, dernoch riet men abisl un men shvagt vater" ("We keep silent, and we keep silent; then we speak a bit, and go on keeping silent").

In 1919, Rebbe Dovidl left Skvira for Kiev due to the Bolshevik revolution, which left smaller cities and towns unsafe. He stayed in Kiev until his death (on 15 Kislev 5680) later that year. He left no published works.

Skver in the U.S.: The New Square Faction

Reb Yakov Yosef
Rebbe Dovidl's son, Rebbe Yakov Yosef (1899–1968) married Trana, the daughter of Rabbi Pinye of Ustilla and granddaughter of Yissachar Dov Rokeach of Belz, in 1925. As a young man, he lived in Belz, and later adopted some of the Belzer customs. A few years later, he set up court in Kalarash, Romania (now Călăraşi, Moldova), and later in Iaşi. After World War II, he lived in Bucharest.

In 1948, after surviving the war in Romania, Yakov Yosef came to the United States.

After spending a few years in Williamsburg, Brooklyn he established a community in what was then rural Rockland County, New York, and named it New Square, where he moved with a few followers in 1956.

Duvid Twersky 

After Yakov Yosef's death in 1968 his son Duvid Twersky became rebbe. Aside from its headquarters in New Square and its branches in New York City, the group maintains institutions in Canada, England, and Israel. Its school in New Square has close to five-thousand students.

Skver in the U.S.: Other branches

Reb Itzikl Skverer 
Rebbe Dovidl's eldest son, Rabbi Mordechai Twerski, died in the same year, before his father in Kiev. During those difficult times, many Jews fled Ukraine and came to America.

Rabbi Mordechai's son, Rabbi Yitzchak Twersky, also left Bessarabia and came to America, arriving in 1923. Eventually, he settled in Borough Park, Brooklyn, and opened his shul on 47th Street, between 13th and 14th Avenue.

Rabbi Yitzchak Twersky died while his son Rabbi Dovid Twersky was still young. Although there were not many vibrant Hasidic communities in America in those days, he was raised in a Hasidic atmosphere in his mother's house where he was guarded against what they considered the "harmful influences" of American culture. Rabbi Dovid Twersky was known for his expertise and influence with many in the medical field, and consequently, was often sought out for advice. He died in 2001, and was succeeded by his son, Rabbi Yechiel Mechel Twersky, the Skwerer Rebbe.

Family tree

Institutions of Skver 
Institutions of Skver include:
Bais Yitzchok boys' school (named after Grand Rabbi Yitzchak Twersky).
Tomer Devorah girls' school (founded by the late Grand Rabbi Dovid Twersky around 1960; the school currently has an enrollment of about two-thousand girls).

There are also summer camps for the boys and girls where they enjoy a range of programs in the summer months.

Dynasty lineage
 Grand Rabbi Yisroel Baal Shem Tov — founder of Hasidism.
 Grand Rabbi Menachem Nachum Twersky of Chernobyl (1730–1797) — author of Meor Einayim and Yesamach Lev; disciple of the Baal Shem Tov.
 Grand Rabbi Mordechai Twersky (1770–1837) — also known as the Chernobyler Magid (Preacher of Chernobyl); son of the Meor Einayim; author of Keser Torah.
 Grand Rabbi Yitzchok (Itzikl) Twersky of Skver (1812–1885) — son of the Magid of Chernobyl; son-in-law of Rabbi Tzvi Hirsh of Skver, a patrilineal descendant of the Baal Shem Tov.
 Grand Rabbi David (Duvidl) Twersky of Skver (1848–1919) — son of Rebbe Itzikl.
 Grand Rabbi Mordechai Twersky of Skver (1868–1919) — son of Rebbe Duvidl.
 Grand Rabbi Yitzchak Twersky of Skver (1888–1941) — arrived in America in 1923, son of Rabbi Mordechai.
 Grand Rabbi David Twersky of Skver- (1922–2001) — son of Rabbi Yitzchak.
 Grand Rabbi Yechiel Michl Twersky — present Skverer Rebbe, son of Rabbi David.
 Grand Rabbi Avroham Yehoshua Heshel Twersky — Nusi Mosdos Skwere, son of Rabbi David
 Grand Rabbi Shlomo Twersky of Skver (1870–1921) — son of Rebbe Duvidl.
 Grand Rabbi Eluzar Twersky of Faltishan-Skver (1893–1976) — Rebbe of Faltishan (Fălticeni, Romania); son of Rabbi Shlomo; arrived in America in 1947.
 Grand Rabbi Yisrael Avraham Stein of Faltishan (1915–1989) — Rabbi of Faltishan, and Faltishaner Rebbe in Brooklyn; son-in-law of Rabbi Elazar; arrived in America in 1946.
 Grand Rabbi Mordechai Stein of Faltishan — present Faltishaner Rabbe; son of Rabbi Yisrael Avraham.
 Rabbi Avrom Twersky of Faltishan (ca. 1920-1985) — Rebbe of Faltishan Borough Park; son of Rabbi Eluzer.
 Grand Rabbi Shulem Meir Twersky — Present Faltishan Borough Park Rebbe; son of Rabbi Avrom.
 Grand Rabbi Yaakov Yosef Twerski of Skver (1899–1968) — Rebbe of New Square; son of Rabbi Duvidl.
 Grand Rabbi Duvid Twersky of Skver — present Rebbe of New Square and Grand Rabbi of the Skverer Hasidim worldwide; son of Rebbe Yaakov Yosef.

Literature 
Meor Eynayim, by the first rebbe of Chernobyl, Rebbe Menachem Nachum Twersky
Toldos Yaakov Yosef, by Rabbi Yaakov Yosef Hakohen of Polnoye, disciple of the Baal Shem Tov
Ohr ha-Chaim ("the light of life"), by Rabbi Haim Ben-Attar, traditionally studied on Friday nights (at the start of the Sabbath).

See also
Chernobyl (Hasidic dynasty)
List of Hasidic dynasties

References

External links
Videos of the Skverer Rebbe's visit to Queens, NY, in 2005
Skverer Rebbe's visit to LA

Bibliography
Yachas Chernobyl V'Ruzhin, by David Aaron Twerski of Zhurik
Reb Itzikl Skverer, by Leibel Surkis, New Square, NY, 1997
Bikdusha Shel Ma'la, Biography of Rabbi Yakov Yosef (Twerski) of Skver, by Mechon Mishkenos Yakov, 2005